Zelaya is a small town of Pilar's Party of the Province of Buenos Aires Republic of Argentina.
It borders the parties Escobar and Campana.
Zelaya has a total population of 2,641 inhabitants. It is where The Miracle of Our Lady of Lujan took place.

History 
Old Spot, which is located in the headquarters of the Pilar's Party XI, which was founded in 1829, which at that time ruled Juan Manuel de Rosas.
His first stay began the population in the  Spot of Zelaya, But on the same land in 1630 the miracle of Our Lady of Luján, near the Río Luján, of Trigueros Rosendo stay.

The Place of the Miracle of Our Lady of Lujan 
Landed at the port of Buenos Aires, the image that should go to Sumampa (Santiago del Estero), stopped at the residence of Don Rosendo, located in the present town Zelaya. Wanting to resume the journey, the oxen refused to move, but to remove the drawers containing the image, the animals were put in motion. Given the evidence of a miracle, the virgin was there and she was venerated in a primitive chapel for 40 years. Then the image was acquired by Ana de Matos and carried to Lujan, where the image currently resides. Today, in a part of the old farm, recalling the miracle, is dedicated to the Immaculate inside a small chapel in whose modest shrine is located a replica of the image that was standing there.

Railway Station 
branch to Victoria Vagues, slice Zelaya Victoria Station (formerly Copello Station) comprised 33.7 kilometers of track, opening to the public service was held on April 30, 1892 (the first Pilar's Party station) and the extension of Zelaya in Capilla del Señor (23, 4 km) on 20 July of the same año. Recién the July 5, 1894 was fought to the service from Capilla del Señor San Antonio de Areco (32, 2 km.) and was ligated with the way San Antonio de Areco - Reef - Parchment, whose administration exercised by the government of the province of Buenos Aires by concession granted on 1 July 1881 and empowerment had made a beginning on 30 August 1882.

At the opening of stretch-Zelaya Victoria is set to 44 km station Garin, on the other hand in a rail network map published in 1895 can clearly see the layout of railway junction station Victoria stations only Garin, Zelaya and Chapel of the Lord. When the Ferrocarril General Bartolomé Mitre railway was operated by Argentines spent more than 80 train loads and long distance commuter who went to the provinces of Santa Fe and Cordoba. You had daily services to Retreat, Victoria, Lord's Chapel, Parchment, Casilda, Venado Tuerto, Corral de Bustos, and Rio Cuarto Rio Tercero in 1995 when the former concessionaire Trenes addresses to Capilla del Senor Zelaya station closes its doors and becomes a train stop.

External links

Pilar Partido
Populated places in Buenos Aires Province
Populated places established in 1829